Purcell & Elmslie (P&E) was the most widely know iteration of a progressive American architectural practice.  P&E was the second most commissioned firm of the Prairie School, after Frank Lloyd Wright. The firm in all iterations was active from 1907 to 1921, with their most famous work being done between 1913 and 1921.

History
The firms consisted of three partnerships: Purcell and Feick (1907–10); Purcell, Feick, and Elmslie (1910–12), and Purcell and Elmslie (1913–21). Elmslie had joined the Minneapolis-based firm in 1907, at the request of Purcell. The architects were commissioned for work in twenty-two states, participated in the competition for the National Parliament Buildings in Canberra, Australia, and prepared plans for a large institutional church, or Y.M.C.A., in Hunan, China.

The two principals of the firm, William Gray Purcell (1880–1965) and George Grant Elmslie (1869–1952) both eventually received Fellowships in the College of the American Institute of Architects.  George Feick Jr. who was son of George Feick, an Ohio contractor, was the original partner with Purcell.  Purcell and Feick had been students together at Cornell University.  They rejoined to tour in Europe together during 1906-1907 and then came to Minneapolis to open their partnership.  The firm had offices in Chicago, Philadelphia, and Minneapolis. A number of works by each of the partnerships are listed on the National Register of Historic Places.

Notable commissions
Steven House (1909), Eau Claire, Wisconsin
Dr. Ward Beebe House (1912), Saint Paul, Minnesota
 Josephine Crane Bradley summer residence (Bradley Bungalow) (1912) Woods Hole, Massachusetts
 Edison Shop (1912) Chicago, Illinois
Merchants National Bank (1912), Winona, Minnesota
 Edna S. Purcell House (1913), Minneapolis, Minnesota
Woodbury County Courthouse (1918), Sioux City, Iowa William L. Steele, Architect, Purcell & Elmslie, Associated Architects (George Grant Elmslie, designing architect)

Works include (with attribution):

Works by Purcell & Feick
Feick Building, built 1909, at 158-160 E. Market St. Sandusky, OH (Purcell & Feick), NRHP-listed
Steven House, built 1909, at 606 Second Ave. Eau Claire, WI (Purcell & Feick), NRHP-listed
Stewart Memorial Presbyterian Church, built 1910, at 116 E. 32nd St. Minneapolis, MN (Purcell & Feick), NRHP-listed

Works by Purcell, Feick & Elmslie
A. B. C. Dodd House, built 1910, at 310 3rd Ave. Charles City, IA (Purcell,Feick & Elmslie), NRHP-listed
Two or three works in the NRHP-listed Bismarck Cathedral Area Historic District, roughly bounded by Hannifan and N 1st Sts., Aves. C and A West Bismarck, ND (Purcell, Feick & Elmslie), NRHP-listed, specifically the Prairie School residences at 120 Avenue A West, at 610 Raymond Street, and at 402 Avenue B West.  The Patrick E. Byrne House (120 Avenue A West) was built in 1912; the Timothy R. Atkinson House (402 Avenue B West) was built c.1910.
Merchants National Bank, built in 1912, at 102 E. 3rd St. Winona, MN (Purcell,Feick & Elmslie), NRHP-listed
Dr. Oscar Owre House, built 1912, at 2625 Newton Ave., S., Minneapolis, MN (Purcell,Feick & Elmslie), NRHP-listed
Merton S. Goodnow House, built 1913, at 446 S. Main St. Hutchinson, MN (Purcell,Feick & Elmslie), NRHP-listed
Charles and Grace Parker House, built 1913, at 4829 Colfax Ave. S. Minneapolis, MN (Purcell,Feick & Elmslie), NRHP-listed
Dr. John H. Adair House, built 1913, at 322 E. Vine St. Owatonna, MN (Purcell,Feick & Elmslie), NRHP-listed
Madison State Bank, Madison, Minnesota, built 1913, razed 1968

Works by Purcell & Elmslie
One or more works in College Hills Historic District, roughly bounded by Colombia Rd., Amherst Dr., Bowdoin Rd., Corporate Limit, University Bay, and Harvard Dr. Shorewood Hills, WI (Purcell and Elmslie), NRHP-listed
Community House, First Congregational Church, 310 Broadway Eau Claire, WI (Purcell & Elmslie), NRHP-listed
Exchange State Bank, NW corner of Main and 1st Sts. Grand Meadow, MN (Purcell & Elmslie), NRHP-listed
First National Bank (Rhinelander, Wisconsin), 8 W. Davenport St. Rhinelander, WI (Purcell & Elmslie), NRHP-listed
First National Bank of Adams, 322 Main St. Adams, MN (Purcell & Elmslie), NRHP-listed
First State Bank of LeRoy, Main St. and Broadway LeRoy, MN (Purcell & Elmslie), NRHP-listed
Dr. J. W. S. Gallagher House, 451 W. Broadway St. Winona, MN (Purcell & Elmslie), NRHP-listed
Jump River Town Hall, S of WI 73 Jump River, WI (Purcell & Elmslie), NRHP-listed
Kasson Municipal Building, 12 W. Main Kasson, MN (Purcell & Elmslie), NRHP-listed
Mrs. Richard Polson House, N of Spooner Spooner, WI (Purcell & Elmslie), NRHP-listed
William Gray Purcell House, 2328 Lake Pl. Minneapolis, MN (Purcell & Elmslie), NRHP-listed
Windego Park Auditorium/Open Air Theater, between S. Ferry St. and Rum River Anoka, MN (Purcell & Elmslie), NRHP-listed
Woodbury County Courthouse, 7th and Douglas Sts. Sioux City, IA (Purcell & Elmslie), NRHP-listed

Photo gallery

References

Further reading
 Brooks, H. Allen, The Prairie School, W.W. Norton, New York 2006;  
 Brooks, H. Allen (editor), Prairie School Architecture: Studies from "The Western Architect", University of Toronto Press, Toronto, Buffalo 1975;  
 Brooks, H. Allen, The Prairie School: Frank Lloyd Wright and his Midwest Contemporaries, University of Toronto Press, Toronto 1972;  
 Gebhard, David (edited by Patricia Gebhard), Purcell & Elmslie: Prairie Progressive Architects, Gibbs Smith, Salt Lake City 2006, 
 Hammons, Mark, "Purcell and Elmslie, Architects," in Art and Life on the Upper Mississippi: Minnesota 1900, University of Delaware Press, 1994 .

External links

 Purcell and Elmslie at Organica

Architecture firms of the United States
Design companies established in 1907
Prairie School architecture

Fellows of the American Institute of Architects
Defunct architecture firms based in Minnesota
Defunct architecture firms based in Pennsylvania
Defunct architecture firms based in Illinois
Design companies disestablished in 1921
1907 establishments in Minnesota
1921 disestablishments in Minnesota